Hyperaspidius is a genus in the family Coccinellidae. There are at least 20 described species in Hyperaspidius.

Species

References

Further reading

 
 
 
 

Coccinellidae
Coccinellidae genera